Aleksandra Potanina (1843–1893), was a Russian explorer. She was married to Grigory Potanin. 

One of the craters of Venus is named after her.

Notes

Sources 
В. и Е. Зарины. Путешествия А. В. Потаниной. — Государственное издательство географической литературы, 1950. — 100 с. — 50 000 экз.

1843 births
1893 deaths
Explorers from the Russian Empire
19th-century people from the Russian Empire
Female explorers